Luis Fernando Garrido (born 5 November 1990) is a Honduran professional footballer for Marathón.

Club career
Born in Juticalpa, Garrido started playing for Juticalpa F.C. in the secondary division when he was 17 years old. By the end of 2007, after his performance in the 2007 FIFA U-17 World Cup he signed a 7-year contract with Olimpia. He made his top-league debut in the 2007–08 Honduran Liga Nacional. He played 6 consecutive seasons with Olimpia, they winning 5 national titles. He spent part of 2011 playing on loan at Deportes Savio.

On 25 January 2013, he agreed to a six-month loan at Red Star Belgrade for the spring 2013 half-season. On 1 February 2013, he was promoted by Red Star Belgrade after he inked his contract for a 6-month loan, with an option to sign a subsequent contract in June 2013 to stay with the club permanently. However at the end of the season Red Star was unable to fulfill the financial demands of Olimpia, so his first experience in Europe came to an end, and subsequently Garrido returned to Olimpia. He played 10 matches in the Serbian SuperLiga and Red Star finished the season runner-up.

On 25 July 2014, he agreed to a loan deal with Houston Dynamo.

International career
As a youth, he was also a "sub" in a 2007 international game against the United States, and later that year played a game for the Honduras national under-17 team against the USA. He played at the 2007 FIFA U-17 World Cup and at the 2012 Summer Olympics.

He made his senior début for Honduras in an October 2012 FIFA World Cup qualification match against Panama. Ever since, he became progressively a key player in the FIFA World Cup qualification matches.

On 17 November 2015, he sustained a horrific knee injury while playing for Honduras in a FIFA World Cup qualification match against Mexico, resulting in the rupture of both PCL and ACL ligaments of his right knee.

Career statistics

Honours
Olimpia
 Liga Nacional de Honduras: 2007–08, 2008–09, 2009–10, 2011–12, 2012–13

References

External links

1990 births
Living people
People from Olancho Department
Association football defenders
Honduran footballers
Honduras international footballers
2013 Copa Centroamericana players
2014 FIFA World Cup players
2015 CONCACAF Gold Cup players
2017 Copa Centroamericana players
Olympic footballers of Honduras
Footballers at the 2012 Summer Olympics
C.D. Olimpia players
Red Star Belgrade footballers
Houston Dynamo FC players
Liga Nacional de Fútbol Profesional de Honduras players
Serbian SuperLiga players
Major League Soccer players
Expatriate footballers in Serbia
Expatriate soccer players in the United States
Copa Centroamericana-winning players
2019 CONCACAF Gold Cup players
C.D. Marathón players